Tiny Island Productions (a.k.a.Tiny Island Productions Pte Ltd) is a CG animation production company based in Singapore. It specializes in both normal CG and stereoscopic 3D productions. It was the animation studio for the Ben 10: Destroy All Aliens CG movie which won the Best 3D Animated Program category at the Asian Television Awards 2012 as well as the award-winning Dream Defenders television series.

History
Tiny Island Productions was founded in 2002 by David Kwok, an animation veteran of 14 years, and has a company strength of 120 staff. One of its first major productions was the Shelldon animated TV series, which it co-developed and co-produced with Shellhut Entertainment.

Dream Defenders
The production house created Singapore's first 3D Stereoscopic animated series Dream Defenders (also known as Dream Defenders Adventures), which debuted in 2011 on 3net, a 3D channel which was a joint venture between Discovery Communications, Sony and IMAX Corporation, and was one of the channel's first stereoscopic-3D cg animated series. The series has since been picked up by Hulu and Discovery Family, and has aired in more than 60 countries around the world. A feature film based on the show is in production and scheduled for release in 2020.

Ben 10: Destroy All Aliens
In 2012, the studio produced Cartoon Network's Ben 10: Destroy All Aliens for both regular and 3D screens. Based on the world and designs of the original Ben 10 TV series, the movie would be the first time the Ben 10 universe would be interpreted in full CG. The film was nominated for the Best 3D Animated Program award at the Asian Television Awards 2012, which it won.

G-Fighters
In 2013, the company began production on G-Fighters, a new CGI action-adventure superhero television series. This is a co-production between South Korean animation production house Electric Circus and Tiny Island Productions, and is the first international co-production between Korea and Singapore animation companies. The animated TV series is supported by SBA, Korea Creative Content Agency (KOCCA), Educational Broadcasting System (EBS), SK Broadband and CJ E&M Pictures.

Virtual Reality
In 2016, Tiny Island Productions, in collaboration with Cisco Systems's PR Agency Allison+Partners, helped the technology company to create its first interactive 3D virtual reality demo. The demo placed the user inside a virtual network under cyber-attacks which would be dealt with by Cisco's advanced security solutions. Originally targeted towards influencers and analysts, it was later opened to clients directly after initial response.

Metaverse

In 2021, Tiny Island Productions signed an MOU with Huawei Technologies to develop a metaverse called Tiny Island Universe. Conceived as a virtual theme park with malls and socialization spaces, it will be created using Huawei's Cloud and AI development platforms.

Awards
Ben 10: Destroy All Aliens won the Best 3D Animated Program category at the Asian Television Awards 2012 as well as the Gold Award for Best Movie Campaign in the 2012 ProMax Awards. The award demonstrated the high level of animation talent on show in Asia and the talent available here, commented Sunny Saha from Turner International.

Dream Defenders won the Best 3D Animation category at the Asia Image Apollo Awards 2013 as well as 2nd place for the Best Animation category at the 14th TBS Digicon 6 awards.

Upcoming productions
It is currently working with Shellhut Entertainment, the owners of Shelldon, to produce the stereoscopic 3D animated film which will be based on the TV series.

In 2017, Tiny Island Productions signed a 10 feature-film co-production deal with Shellhut Entertainment and Shanghai Media Group's WingsMedia. The first film, to be completed for theatrical release in 2020, will be partially based on the company's Dream Defenders series.

Productions
Shelldon (2009)
Ben 10: Destroy All Aliens (2012)
Dream Defenders (2011-2012)
Talking Tom and Friends  (2014–present)

References

External links
Tiny Island Productions Official Website

Animation studios
Mass media companies established in 2002
Singaporean companies established in 2002
Mass media companies of Singapore